The Green Eyed is a 2015 Nigerian drama film, directed by Blessing O. Uduefe. It stars Nse Ikpe Etim, Kalu Ikeagwu, Tamara Eteimo and Blossom Chukwujekwu. The film was shot in Port Harcourt.

Cast
Nse Ikpe Etim as 
Kalu Ikeagwu as 
Tamara Eteimo as 
Blossom Chukwujekwu as
Tania Nwosu as
Endy Abanonkhua as
Phil Isibo as

References

External links

Films shot in Port Harcourt
2015 drama films
2015 films
Nigerian drama films
English-language Nigerian films
2010s English-language films
English-language drama films